Frédéric Xhonneux (born 11 May 1983 in Brussels) is a Belgian track and field athlete who competes in the decathlon. He is a former Belgian record holder in the event with a score of 8142 points, achieved in May 2008 in Desenzano del Garda at the Multistars meeting.

Achievements

External links

1983 births
Living people
Belgian decathletes
Olympic athletes of Belgium
Athletes (track and field) at the 2008 Summer Olympics
Sportspeople from Brussels